Henri Nathansen (17 July 1868 – 16 February 1944) was a Danish writer and stage director, today best known for the play Inside the Walls.

Biography
Nathansen grew up in a merchant family in Copenhagen.  Abandoning a legal career, he turned to writing and later directing.  His best known work, Inside the Walls, premiered in 1912 at the Royal Danish Theatre, directed by the author.  The play centers around a wealthy, loving, but conservative Jewish family whose only daughter breaks away from tradition by attending lectures at the university and secretly becoming engaged to her teacher, a gentile.  Still frequently performed, the play was included in the official Canon of Danish Culture in 2006.

Nathansen's 1932 novel Mendel Philipsen and Son,  about a Jewish woman who falls in love with a gentile painter but instead enters into a loveless marriage with her Jewish cousin, was adapted for the 1992 movie Sofie.

Late in his career, Nathansen wrote a number of biographies, notably one of Georg Brandes (1929).

In October 1943, when the Nazis attempted to round up the Danish Jews, Nathansen fled to Sweden.  Four months later, he killed himself.

Legacy
A bust of Nathansen stands in the small garden complex Digterlunden next to the Town Hall Square in Frederiksberg.

References

Sources

External links 

 

20th-century Danish dramatists and playwrights
Danish theatre directors
19th-century Danish biographers
Male biographers
Danish Jews
Suicides in Denmark
1868 births
1944 suicides
Jewish dramatists and playwrights
Danish male novelists
Danish male dramatists and playwrights
20th-century Danish novelists
20th-century Danish male writers
Suicides by Jews during the Holocaust